Chirixalus dudhwaensis, commonly known as the Dudhwa tree frog, is a species of frog in the family Rhacophoridae. It is endemic to India, being only known from the vicinity of the type locality, Dudhwa National Park in Uttar Pradesh. Its natural habitats are subtropical or tropical moist lowland forests, subtropical or tropical moist shrubland, subtropical or tropical seasonally wet or flooded lowland grassland, swamps, and freshwater marshes.

References

Chirixalus
Frogs of India
Endemic fauna of Uttar Pradesh
Taxonomy articles created by Polbot
Amphibians described in 1992